Events from the year 1248 in Ireland.

Incumbent
Lord: Henry III

Events
King's Bench in Dublin is instituted (today contained within the Four Courts).
Coleraine Castle is built.
Goffraidh is inaugurated as "The O'Donnell", i.e. chief of the O'Donnell clan.
Carrickfergus Abbey is founded by the Franciscan order.
Jordan de Exeter, Sheriff of Connacht, deals with rebellion in the Clew Bay area (according to the Annals of Connacht).

Births

Deaths
Walter de Burgo buried at Athassel Priory.
Rory O'Cannon, the last chieftain of the O'Cannon clan is killed.

References

 
1240s in Ireland
Ireland
Years of the 13th century in Ireland